Kruisstraat is a small Dutch settlement. It is located east of Rosmalen, in the municipality of 's-Hertogenbosch, and province of North Brabant.

Populated places in North Brabant
's-Hertogenbosch